George Gibbs (3 October 1905 – 27 February 1987) was an Australian rules footballer who played with Fitzroy and Collingwood in the Victorian Football League (VFL).

Family
The son of George Gibbs (1879-1943), and Ada Alice Gibbs (1879-1962), née Musgrove, George Gibbs was born at Carlton, Victoria on 3 October 1905. His brother, Leslie Gibbs (1918-1976), played with Melbourne and Preston.

Notes

External links 

George Gibbs's profile at Collingwood Forever

1905 births
1987 deaths
Australian rules footballers from Melbourne
Fitzroy Football Club players
Collingwood Football Club players
People from Carlton, Victoria